= Franklin Street Arts Collective =

Art gallery in Carrboro, North Carolina

Coordinates: 35°54′38″N 79°4′4″W

- Trade name: FRANK Gallery
- Website: frankisart.com

Franklin Street Arts Collective is an art gallery, art collective, and non-profit organization located in Carrboro, North Carolina. Franklin Street Arts Collective is commonly called FRANK. FRANK features a wide variety of art by local and regional artists including painting, mixed media, ceramics, furniture, jewelry, and sculpture. FRANK is a contemporary fine arts gallery, featuring work by local artists and enriching the community through exhibitions, events, and arts education.
